is a town located in Oda District, Okayama Prefecture, Japan.

As of june 1 2020, the town has an estimated population of 14,041 and a density of 147 persons per km². The total area is 90.62 km².

The town is home to a former post station along the San'yōdō and contains a sub-honjin from the Edo period. A samurai parade (大名行列) is held every November in commemoration of the town's history as a major stopping point on the daimyōs trip to Edo during the era of sankin-kōtai.

Geography

Neighbouring municipalities 

 Kurashiki
 Asakuchi
 Ibara
 Kasaoka
 Soja

Transportation

Railway 

 Ibara Railway: Ibara Line
 Mitani - Yakage - Oda

Highway 

 Japan National Route 486

Notable people from Yakage
Okanoyama Yoshiro, former sumo wrestler
Go Ibuki , Japanese actor.

References

External links

Yakage official website 
Tourist Guide

Towns in Okayama Prefecture